Danny Barrett may refer to:
 Danny Barrett (American football)
 Danny Barrett (rugby union)

See also
 Daniel Barrett (disambiguation)